Erythemis vesiculosa, the great pondhawk, is a dragonfly of the family Libellulidae. It is distributed throughout the Americas as far north as the United States.

References

External links
Erythemis vesiculosa. NatureServe. 2012.

Libellulidae
Odonata of North America
Odonata of South America
Arthropods of Colombia
Insects of Central America
Insects of Mexico
Insects of the United States
Least concern biota of North America
Least concern biota of South America
Insects described in 1775
Taxa named by Johan Christian Fabricius